Ripper  or The Ripper may refer to:

People 
 Ripper (surname)
 Paul Burchill, ring name "The Ripper", a professional wrestler based on Jack the Ripper
 Kirk Hammett, nicknamed "The Ripper", the lead guitarist in the heavy metal band Metallica
 Jack the Ripper, a pseudonym for an unidentified serial killer (or killers) active in London in the latter half of 1888
 Ripper Jayanandan (born 1968), Indian serial killer
 Tim "Ripper" Owens, a heavy metal singer
 Psicosis II, a Mexican Luchador enmascarado who was renamed Psyco Ripper and then Ripper
 Terry "The Ripper" Rivera, a professional wrestler from All-Star Wrestling
 Danny Rolling, serial killer known as the "Gainesville Ripper"
 Peter Sutcliffe, known as the Yorkshire Ripper, a serial killer active in Yorkshire from 1975–1980
 Brandon Vedas, nicknamed "Ripper", a man who died of a drug overdose on IRC

Arts and entertainment

Fictional characters 
 Ripper (G.I. Joe), in the G.I. Joe universe
 "Ripper", the villain in the Arnold Schwarzenegger film Last Action Hero
 Rupert Giles, a major character from the TV series Buffy the Vampire Slayer also known as "Ripper"
 General Jack D. Ripper, in the movie Dr. Strangelove, played by Sterling Hayden
 Rippers, horizontally flying bug-like creatures belonging to the Metroid series
 Rippers, a race of mutant kangaroo–human hybrids in the graphic novel and film Tank Girl
 Stefan Salvatore, from The Vampire Diaries also known as "Ripper"

Film and television
 Ripper (film), a 2001 Canadian-British slasher film
 Ripper (Buffy the Vampire Slayer spinoff), a proposed TV series featuring the character Rupert Giles
 The Ripper (TV series), a 2020 British docuseries about Peter Sutcliffe, the Yorkshire Ripper
 "Ripper" (The Outer Limits), a television episode

Games
 Ripper (video game), a computer game released in 1996
 The Ripper (video game), a video game cancelled in 2009

Literature
 Ripper (El juego de Ripper), a novel by Isabel Allende
 Ripper, the fourth novel in Michael Slade's long-running Special X series

Music
 Ripper, a Houston heavy metal band, and recording artists for Black Widow Records
 "The Ripper", a song by Judas Priest, from the album Sad Wings of Destiny

Devices 
 Ripper,  slater's tool with a blade and a hook, used for removing broken slate
 Ripper, a moveable hard steel hook on the back of a bulldozer used to break up hard soil or pavement
 CD ripper, a piece of software that reads compact discs and extracts audio data and stores it in an audio format computer file
 DVD ripper, a computer application that copies the contents of a DVD to a hard disk
 A type of small cordless chainsaw, used by the Enclave and Brotherhood of Steel in the Fallout series.

Sports
 Grand Rapids (baseball team), known as the Rippers in 1894 and 1896
 London Rippers, a former professional baseball team based in London, Ontario, Canada

Other uses 
 Ripper (food), a variety of hot dog served in New Jersey
 Ripper (racquet), a racquetball racquet from Wilson Sporting Goods
 Ripper, a colloquialism for flatulence
 Gibson Ripper, a model of electric bass guitar
 Operation Ripper, a United Nations Korean War operation
 Repeated Incremental Pruning to Produce Error Reduction (RIPPER), a propositional rule learner
 A type of bulldozer for breaking a ground surface

See also 
 Rip (disambiguation)
 RIP (disambiguation)